Stephen Florida is a 2017 novel by American author Gabe Habash. It is Habash's debut novel. It concerns college wrestling.

Development
Habash was drawn to write about wrestling because of how demanding and unforgiving it is. He sought for the narration and the book to be unpredictable.

Reception
According to literary review aggregator Literary Hub, the novel received mostly positive reviews.

References

2017 American novels
2017 debut novels
Coffee House Press books